St. Mary's, St. Marys, or St. Maries may refer to the following places:

Australia
 St Marys, New South Wales, a suburb of Sydney
 St Marys railway station, Sydney
 North St Marys, New South Wales, a suburb of Sydney
 St Marys, South Australia, a suburb of Adelaide
 St Mary's on the Sturt, the eponymous church 
 St Marys, Tasmania, on the east coast of Tasmania
St. Mary's Hostel (Alice Springs), a hostel for Aboriginal girls at Alice Springs, NT, from 1947 to 1972

Canada
 St. Mary's Bay, Newfoundland and Labrador, bay on the Avalon Peninsula of Newfoundland and Labrador
 Cape St. Mary's, headland on the Avalon Peninsula of Newfoundland and Labrador
 St. Mary's, Newfoundland and Labrador, in electoral district of Avalon
 Municipality of the District of St. Mary's, a municipal district in Guysborough County, Nova Scotia
 St Mary's River, Nova Scotia
 St. Marys, Ontario

France
 Saintes-Maries-de-la-Mer, a town in the Camargue

Ireland
 St. Mary's, Athlone (civil parish), in the barony of Brawny, County Westmeath
 St. Mary's, Fore, a civil parish in the barony of Fore, County Westmeath

Jamaica
 Saint Mary Parish, Jamaica

Madagascar
Île Sainte-Marie, an island in Madagascar's Toamasina Province

Trinidad and Tobago
 St. Mary's, Trinidad and Tobago, a community in west-central Trinidad

United Kingdom

 St Mary's (Trafford ward), an electoral ward in Greater Manchester 
 St Mary's, Devon, part of Plympton, England
 St Mary's, Orkney
 St Mary's, Isles of Scilly, one of the Isles of Scilly
 St Mary's Airport, Isles of Scilly
 St Mary's, Southampton, a suburb of Southampton, England
 St Mary's Stadium, the home of Southampton F.C.

 St Mary's College, Crosby, an independent Roman Catholic school in Crosby

 St Mary's Hospital, London

 St Mary's Island (Tyne and Wear), an island near Whitley Bay, Tyne and Wear
 St Mary's Lighthouse, a lighthouse on the island
 St. Mary's railway station (England), a closed railway station in Cambridgeshire
 St. Mary's (Whitechapel Road) tube station, a former London Underground station on the District line

United States
St. Mary's, Alaska
St. Mary's, Colorado
St. Marys, Georgia
Saint Marys, Floyd County, Indiana
Saint Marys, Franklin County, Indiana
St. Marys, Kansas
St. Marys, Ohio
Fort St. Mary's, a former fort in St. Marys
St. Mary's County, Maryland
St. Mary's City, Maryland
St. Marys, Pennsylvania
St. Marys, South Dakota
St. Marys, West Virginia

Other uses
 St. Mary's Church (disambiguation)
 St Mary's (Trafford ward), political district

See also
 Saint Mary's Gaels, the intercollegiate athletic program of Saint Mary's College of California
 St Marys Saints, an Australian rugby league club
 St. Mary's Seahawks, the intercollegiate athletic program of St. Mary's College of Maryland
 St. Mary's Strip, an entertainment district in San Antonio, Texas
 
 
 
 
 Lady chapel, which may also be known as a "St Mary's"
 Mount St. Mary's (disambiguation)
 Saint Mary (disambiguation)
 St. Mary's Academy (disambiguation)
 Saint Mary's Bay (disambiguation)
 Saint Mary's Cathedral (disambiguation)
 Saint Mary's Cemetery (disambiguation)
 Saint Mary's Church (disambiguation)
 Saint Mary's College (disambiguation)
 St Mary's GAA (disambiguation), several sports clubs in Ireland
 St. Mary's Hall (disambiguation)
 Saint Mary's Hospital (disambiguation)
 Saint Mary's Island (disambiguation)
 Saint Mary's River (disambiguation)
 St. Mary's Road (disambiguation)
 St. Mary's School (disambiguation)
 Saint Mary's University (disambiguation)
 Sainte-Marie (disambiguation)
 Santa Maria (disambiguation)